Rexach is a surname. Notable people with the surname include:

 Carles Rexach (born 1947), Spanish footballer and manager
 Eduardo Serra Rexach (born 1946), Spanish politician and businessman
 Félix Benítez Rexach (1886–1975), Puerto Rican engineer and businessman
 Jaime Benítez Rexach (1908–2001), Puerto Rican author, academic, and politician
 Juan Rexach (fl. 1431–1482), Spanish painter and miniaturist
 Roberto Rexach Benítez (1929–2012), Puerto Rican politician
 Sylvia Rexach (1922–1961), Puerto Rican scriptwriter, poet, singer, and composer